Cnissostages osae is a species of moth in the family Arrhenophanidae. It is known only from the Osa Peninsula in southern Costa Rica.

The length of the forewings is about 11 mm for males. Adults are on wing in February, April and May.

Etymology
The species name is derived from the general type locality, located on the Osa Peninsula of Costa Rica.

External links
Family Arrhenophanidae

Arrhenophanidae
Taxa named by Donald R. Davis (entomologist)
Moths described in 2003